Caroline Franc, also known as Caroline Desages, is a French journalist, writer and screenwriter, born in 1971.

Biography 
After training as a journalist at the Centre de formation des journalistes de Paris, she first worked at AEF info, where she focused particularly on higher education.

From 2007, she writes practical books on everyday life for Hachette Editions. She is the editor of the blog Pensées de rondes and from it has drawn the show Dans la peau d'une grosse, performed for a year at le Lieu theatre.

In 2011, she became a freelancer for many newspapers and magazines: on the one hand for the women's press (Psychologies magazine, Cosmopolitan, Pleine Vie or Avantages), on the other hand always on higher education subjects.

She is also a scriptwriter and has worked on several occasions for French television. She collaborated on the television series Parents mode d'emploi (France 2) as a scriptwriter and then collection director. She joined the series Clem (TF1) from season 8. She is also a screenwriter for TV movies (Liés pour la vie, based on the novel by Laëtitia Milot, 2021) or isolated episodes of series (Joséphine, ange gardien).

And finally, she is the author of a novel, Mission hygge, in 2018.

Works 
 Comment baiser en cachette, Paris: Hachette, 2007
 How to be a good, unworthy mother, Paris: Hachette pratique, 2007
 Comment grignoter en cachette, Paris : Hachette pratique, 2007
 Libido at half mast? Pimentez votre couple !, Paris: Hachette pratique, 2007
 Et si j'ai arrêtais d'avoir peur de m'engager, de faire un bébé, de changer de boulot, Paris : Hachette pratique, 2008
 Êtes-vous sûr d'avoir trouvé le bon ?, Paris: Hachette pratique, 2009
 Maman, faut couper le cordon !, Paris: Hachette pratique, 2009
 How to seduce a man (for sure), Paris: Hachette pratique, 2010
 30 days to get rid of your complexes, Levallois-Perret: Studyrama-Vocatis, 2011
 Abécédaire de mon bébé, Paris: Chêne, 2012
 Abécédaire d'une femme enceinte, Paris: Chêne, 2012
 Cojean tout simplement, Paris: La Martinière, 2012
 Le guide des super parents de jumeaux, Paris: Mango, 2017
 Le guide des super parents d'ados, Paris: Mango, 2017
 Happy at work! 52 situations de crise à résoudre en un clin d'œil, Paris: éditions First, 2017
 Mission hygge, Paris: éditions First, 2018

References

1971 births
21st-century French journalists
21st-century French novelists
French women screenwriters
Living people
21st-century French women